Ronald E. Fox is a psychologist and a former president of the American Psychological Association (APA).

Career
Fox was on the faculty at the University of North Carolina and Ohio State University early in his career. By 1975, he was exploring the possibility of founding a school of professional psychology in Ohio that would offer the Doctor of Psychology (Psy.D.) degree. He founded one of the first Psy.D. programs in the country at Wright State University in 1979. He was the APA's 1994 president. In 2009, he was selected to receive an APA award of excellence named after Raymond D. Fowler.

Fox has advocated for the viewpoint that psychology should train its practitioners to think beyond simply treating mental illness. He wrote that professional psychology is "that profession which is concerned with enhancing the effectiveness of human behavior."

References

Living people
Ohio State University faculty
University of North Carolina at Chapel Hill faculty
Wright State University faculty
Presidents of the American Psychological Association
Year of birth missing (living people)